The Mobile Symphony Orchestra is the symphonic orchestra of Mobile, Alabama. Scott Speck is the current music director.

Concerts
The Mobile Symphony Orchestra holds a 7 concert season from September to May of each year. The season consists of 6 traditional classical concerts, and 1 holiday concert. Annual traditions include Beethoven and Blue Jeans in November, and Holiday in December. The orchestra has performed repertoire from all musical styles and periods, and has hosted many world-renowned artists, including Yo-Yo Ma and Renee Fleming.

History
The roots of the Mobile Symphony Orchestra date back to 1970, with the establishment of Symphony Concerts of Mobile. In 1996, the organization's board began planning the development of a full-time professional orchestra to permanently reside in Mobile. In 1997, the name of the company was changed to "Mobile Symphony, Inc," and in 1998 the orchestra held its first concert season. The Symphony's first and current music director, Scott Speck, was named in 2000. In 2002, under the leadership of mayor Michael Dow, the company acquired a building at 257 Dauphin Street in downtown Mobile, which became the Larkins Music Center. The building includes office space, a large recital hall, practice rooms, meeting facilities, and a landscaped courtyard. The building also has a connection to the historic Mobile Saenger Theater, where the Orchestra performs all concerts.

See also
Alabama Symphony Orchestra

External links
mobilesymphony.org

American orchestras
Musical groups from Alabama
Cultural institutions in Mobile, Alabama
Musical groups established in 1970
Performing arts in Alabama